St. John the Baptist Catholic School, formerly Holy Child Parochial School (1963–2005) is an institution owned and administered by the Archdiocese of Manila, under the Manila Archdiocesan and Parochial Schools Association System, run by the St. John the Baptist Parish, the parish priest and the school director.

History
In the municipality of San Juan in the Archdiocese of Manila under the Parish of St. John the Baptist, Pinaglabanan, San Juan, Metro Manila a kindergarten class was started by Fr., OP, SJ within the Augustinian Sisters compound along Santolan Rd, SJ. With the opening of the first grade class in July 1963, Mother General Evangelista de San Agustine, OSA was able to seek government recognition for their school, Jesus of Prague Kindergarten School and asked the permission of Cardinal Rufino Santos to open the school. The Cardinal responded that he would only approve the opening of a Catholic school if it was to be in the premises of the parish and managed by the sisters, and the parish priest was to be Honorary Director of the school.

In 1973 the Articles of Incorporation of the Holy Child Parochial School of San Juan, Rizal Inc. came out as a duly registered incorporation under the (SEC).

In 1976 the HCPS became a member of MAPSA and CEAP, under the leadership of Msgr. Protacio Gungon.

In 1979, Msgr. Alfredo Rodriguez was appointed by Jaime Cardinal L. Sin as parish priest and school director of HCPS, where he remained for almost 21 years. During his incumbency the school outreach programs were initiated and a four-story school building constructed.

On October 1, 2002, Fr. Francisco M. Ungria Jr. was appointed parish priest and school director. His responsibilities included the academic and financial running of the school. He was responsible for renovating the school, and the construction of the high school building in the vicinity. The school changed its name from Holy Child Parochial School to St. John the Baptist Catholic School, Inc. at the start of school year 2004–2005. He appointed Fr. Nolan Que, Ph.D. as Principal of the school. On September 26, 2005 the change of name was approved by the Securities and Exchange Commission.

Xavier School, which is also in San Juan, signs a MOA with St. John the Baptist Catholic School. 

In June 2011, there was a turn-over of Principalship from Rev. Fr. Nolan A. Que, Ph.D to Rev. Fr. Adolfo T. Paroni Jr. On March 28, 2014, the graduation of the Senior batch 2014, Fr. Frank ceased to be the school director pursuant to the decision of Luis Antonio G. Cardinal Tagle D.D. that a priest should only have one ministry, continuing to be the Parish Priest of St. John the Baptist Parish. In response to the needs of the times and in consonance with the RCAM-ES Program, schools are clustered into groups. At present, Saint John the Baptist Catholic School belongs to cluster 7 under the directorship of Rev. Fr. Maxell Lowell C. Aranilla, Ph.D. with Rev. Fr. Rany P. Geraldino as the Assistant Director and Mr. Noel F. Noble, Ph.D. as the Principal respectively. The cluster includes six other schools namely: Our Lady of Guadalupe Minor Seminary, Paco Catholic School, St. Pius X Parochial School, St. Joseph's School – Pandacan, Guadalupe Catholic School and San Isidro Catholic School.

In 2015, SJBCS started to adapt the Genyo e-Learning for the SY 2015–2016.

In school year 2016–2017, there was a turnover of principalship from Mr. Noel F. Noble to Ms. Tanya P. Namit.

In school year 2017–2018, there was a turnover of principalship from Ms. Tanya P. Namit to Mr. Gilbert D. Gayob

Curriculum
The school adapts the K-12 Curriculum for Kindergarten to Grade 12 Students.

School Clubs & Organizations

Organizations
Student Council
This is the student governing body of the school which serves as the voice of the pupils / students in expressing their general needs, interests, and opinions in the administration. It assists the administration in the implementation of the school's rules and regulations.
Junior Class Organization
This is the governing council of the Junior Class specifically during the Juniors-Seniors' Promenade.
Senior Class Organization
This is the governing council of the Senior Class specifically during the Juniors-Seniors' Promenade.

Clubs
The PREACHERS (Journalism Club)
It is the official School Publication that informs the school community of its events and activities.

Altar Servers Ministry
Develops the love and devotion to serve the Lord by participating in the Liturgical celebrations; the moderator coordinates with the parish for training and practicum; membership is open to boys from Grade 4 to 10.

Scouting (BSP & GSP)
[Kab Scouts - Seniors Scouts (BSP)], [Star Scouts - Cadet Scouts (GSP)]; Trains the pupils / students to be future leaders and to be of service to others.

Sports Ministry (Girls & Boys Division)
Encourages sports-minded pupils / students to develop sportsmanship, camaraderie, self-discipline among athletes.

Vox Johannes / Choir Ministry
Creates an atmosphere of true worship using music as a tool of a holistic worship experience.

Musicians Ministry
Offered to students with special musical talents and with exceptional interest in musical instruments to assist in the school programs, liturgical and para-liturgical activities.

Dance Ministry
Encourages, supports and produces entertainment with love, growth, passion and dedication.

Arts Ministry
Fosters a balanced and harmonious ministry through consolidation of existing pluralism, promotion of creativity and the celebration of cultural values.

Theater Arts Ministry
Either Filipino or English. Provides the highest level of artistic instruction and performance while maintaining a standard Preachers' values and integrity.

Lectors-Commentators Ministry
Prepares and proclaims the readings during the Institutional Mass.

Information-Communication Ministry
Trains and molds the students in exploring technology through computer techniques, soft wares etc.

Special clubs
Drum and Lyre
Offered to students who can play such instruments during school events.
Kiddie Club
Open for Kinder - Grade Three pupils.

Notable alumni
 Amy Perez-Castillo - Actress, Main Host of Umagang Kay Ganda and It's Showtime
 Zsa Zsa Padilla - Singer, Actress, Main Host of ASAP
 Jiro Manio - Actor

References

Educational institutions established in 1963
Catholic elementary schools in Metro Manila
Catholic secondary schools in Metro Manila
Schools in San Juan, Metro Manila
1963 establishments in the Philippines